Mount Kerr is a mountain in the Victoria Cross Ranges of Alberta, Canada. It is set within Jasper National Park in the Canadian Rockies. The peak was named for Private John Chipman Kerr who earned the Victoria Cross for his actions in 1916 during World War I.

Climate
Based on the Köppen climate classification, Mount Kerr is located in a subarctic climate zone with cold, snowy winters, and mild summers. Winter temperatures can drop below  with wind chill factors below .

See also
 
 Geography of Alberta

References

External links
 Mount Kerr: weather forecast
 Parks Canada web site: Jasper National Park

Two-thousanders of Alberta
Mountains of Jasper National Park